The 2021 Houston Cougars football team represented the University of Houston in the 2021 NCAA Division I FBS football season. The Cougars played their home games at TDECU Stadium in Houston, Texas, competing in the American Athletic Conference. They were led by third-year head coach Dana Holgorsen.

Previous season

The Cougars finished the 2020 season 3–5, 3–3 in AAC play to finish sixth in the conference. They lost the New Mexico Bowl 14–28 against Hawaii.

Preseason

American Athletic Conference preseason media poll
The American Athletic Conference preseason media poll was released at the virtual media day held August 4, 2021. Cincinnati, who finished the 2020 season ranked No. 8 nationally, was tabbed as the preseason favorite in the 2021 preseason media poll.

Schedule

Notes
 This game was initially scheduled for ESPNU at 3:00 p.m. CT, but was moved to 8:20 p.m. CT on ESPNews because of a rain delay.

Game summaries

vs. Texas Tech (Texas Kickoff)

at Rice (Bayou Bucket Classic)

Grambling State

Navy

at Tulsa

at Tulane

East Carolina

No. 19 SMU

at South Florida

at Temple

Memphis

at UConn

at No. 4 Cincinnati (AAC Championship Game)

vs. Auburn (Birmingham Bowl)

Rankings

References

Houston
Houston Cougars football seasons
Birmingham Bowl champion seasons
Houston Cougars football